The 1991 North Dakota Fighting Sioux football team, also known as the Nodaks, was an American football team that represented the University of North Dakota as a member of the North Central Conference (NCC) during the 1991 NCAA Division II football season. Led by sixth-year head coach Roger Thomas, the Fighting Sioux compiled an overall record of 7–2 with a mark of 6–2 in conference play, tying for second place in the NCC. North Dakota played home games at Memorial Stadium in Grand Forks, North Dakota.

Schedule

References

North Dakota
North Dakota Fighting Hawks football seasons
North Dakota Fighting Sioux football